Vitaly Sapronov (Russian: Виталий Сапронов; born 17 June 1945) is a Soviet rower. He competed at the 1972 Summer Olympics in Munich with the men's coxless four where they came in fourth place.

References

1945 births
Living people
Soviet male rowers
Olympic rowers of the Soviet Union
Rowers at the 1972 Summer Olympics